The Kiwanis Meeting Hall, also known as Kiwanis Chapel, is a site on the National Register of Historic Places located near Havre, Montana.  It was added to the Register on March 31, 2010.  The Kiwanis Meeting Hall is within Kiwanis Camp, located in Beaver Creek Park, the largest county-owned park in Montana.

External links
Original request form

References

Clubhouses on the National Register of Historic Places in Montana
Kiwanis
National Register of Historic Places in Hill County, Montana
Buildings and structures completed in 1933
1933 establishments in Montana
Rustic architecture in Montana